The Plant List recognises about 266 accepted taxa (of species and infraspecific names) in the plant genus Scleria.

Species
This list is compiled from The Plant List, Germplasm Resources Information Network, Integrated Taxonomic Information System and Flora of China.

 Scleria abortiva  
 Scleria acanthocarpa  
 Scleria achtenii  
 Scleria adpressohirta  
 Scleria afroreflexa  
 Scleria alpina  
 Scleria amazonica  
 Scleria anceps  
 Scleria andringitrensis  
 Scleria angusta  
 Scleria angustifolia  
 Scleria annularis  
 Scleria anomala  
 Scleria arcuata  
 Scleria arguta  
 Scleria aromatica  
 Scleria assamica  
 Scleria atroglumis  
 Scleria balansae  
 Scleria baldwinii  – Baldwin's nutrush
 Scleria bambariensis  
 Scleria bancana  – winged scleria 
 Scleria baroni-clarkei  
 Scleria baronii  
 Scleria barteri  
 Scleria benthamii  
 Scleria bequaertii  
 Scleria bicolor  
 Scleria biflora  
 Scleria boivinii  
 Scleria boniana  
 Scleria borii  
 Scleria bourgeaui  – Bourgeau's nutrush
 Scleria bracteata  – bracted nutrush 
 Scleria bradei  
 Scleria brownii  
 Scleria buekiana  
 Scleria buettneri  
 Scleria bulbifera  
 Scleria burchellii  
 Scleria calcicola  
 Scleria camaratensis  
 Scleria canescens  
 Scleria carphiformis  
 Scleria castanea  
 Scleria catharinensis  
 Scleria catophylla  
 Scleria chevalieri  
 Scleria chlorocalyx  
 Scleria ciliaris  
 Scleria ciliata  – fringed nutrush
 var. elliottii  
 var. glabra  
 Scleria clarkei  
 Scleria clathrata 
 Scleria cochinchinensis   
 Scleria colorata  
 Scleria comosa  
 Scleria complanata  
 Scleria composita  
 Scleria corymbosa  
 Scleria cubensis  – Cuban nutrush 
 Scleria curtissii  – Curtiss' nutrush 
 Scleria cuyabensis 
 Scleria cyathophora  
 Scleria cyperina  
 Scleria delicatula  
 Scleria densispicata  
 Scleria depauperata  
 Scleria depressa  
 Scleria distans  – riverswamp nutrush
 var. chondrocarpa  
 var. glomerulata  
 Scleria dregeana  
 Scleria dulungensis  
 Scleria eggersiana  – Eggers' nutrush
 Scleria elongatissima  
 Scleria erythrorrhiza  
 Scleria fauriei  
 Scleria filiculmis  
 Scleria flagellum-nigrorum  
 Scleria flexuosa  
 Scleria foliosa  
 Scleria foveolata  
 Scleria fulvipilosa  
 Scleria gaertneri  
 Scleria georgiana  – slenderfruit nutrush
 Scleria glabra  
 Scleria globonux  
 Scleria goosenii  
 Scleria goossensii  
 Scleria gracillima  
 Scleria greigiifolia  
 Scleria guineensis  
 Scleria harlandii  
 Scleria havanensis  – Havana nutrush
 Scleria hildebrandtii  
 Scleria hilsenbergii  
 Scleria hirta  
 Scleria hirtella  – riverswamp nutrush 
 Scleria hispidior  
 Scleria hispidula  
 Scleria hookeriana  
 Scleria huberi  
 Scleria induta  
 Scleria interrupta  
 Scleria iostephana  
 Scleria jiangchengensis  
 Scleria junghuhniana  
 Scleria kerrii  
 Scleria khasiana  
 Scleria killipiana  
 Scleria kindtiana  
 Scleria lacustris  – lakeshore nutrush
 Scleria laevis  – smooth scleria 
 Scleria lagoensis  
 Scleria latifolia  
 Scleria laxa  
 Scleria laxiflora  
 Scleria leptostachya  
 Scleria levis  
 Scleria lingulata  
 Scleria lithosperma  – Florida Keys nutrush
 var. linearis  
 subsp. linearis  
 subsp. lithosperma 
 Scleria longispiculata  
 Scleria lucentinigricans  
 Scleria macbrideana  
 Scleria mackaviensis  
 Scleria macrogyne  
 Scleria macrolomioides  
 Scleria macrophylla  
 Scleria madagascariensis  
 Scleria martii  
 Scleria melaleuca  
 Scleria melanomphala  
 Scleria melanotricha  
 Scleria melicoides  
 Scleria microcarpa  – tropical nutrush
 Scleria mikawana  
 Scleria millespicula  
 Scleria minima  
 Scleria minor  – slender nutrush
 Scleria mitis  – cortadora
 Scleria monticola  
 Scleria motemboensis  
 Scleria motleyi  
 subsp. rostrata  
 Scleria mucronata  
 Scleria muehlenbergii  – Muehlenberg's nutrush
 Scleria multilacunosa  
 Scleria mutoensis  
 Scleria myricocarpa  
 Scleria natalensis  
 Scleria naumanniana  
 Scleria neesii  
 Scleria neocaledonica  
 Scleria neogranatensis  
 Scleria novae-hollandiae  
 Scleria nyasensis  
 Scleria oblata  
 Scleria obtusa  
 Scleria oligantha  – littlehead nutrush
 Scleria oligochondra  
 Scleria orchardii  
 Scleria ovinux  
 Scleria pachyrrhyncha  
 Scleria panicoides  
 Scleria papuana  
 Scleria parallella  
 Scleria parvula  
 Scleria patula  
 Scleria pauciflora  – fewflower nutrush
 var. caroliniana  
 var. curtissii  
 Scleria paupercula  
 Scleria pergracilis  
 Scleria pernambucana  
 Scleria perpusilla  
 Scleria pilosa  
 Scleria pilosissima  
 Scleria plusiophylla  
 Scleria poeppigii  
 Scleria poiformis  
 Scleria poklei  
 Scleria polycarpa  
 Scleria polyrrhiza  
 Scleria pooides  
 Scleria porphyrocarpa  
 Scleria procumbens  
 Scleria psilorrhiza  
 Scleria pulchella  
 Scleria purdiei  – Purdie's nutrush
 Scleria purpurascens  
 var. ophirensis  
 Scleria pusilla  
 Scleria racemosa  
 Scleria radula  
 Scleria ramosa  
 Scleria rehmannii  
 Scleria reticularis  – reticulated nutrush, netted nutrush 
 Scleria richardsiae  
 Scleria robinsoniana  
 Scleria robusta  
 Scleria rugosa  
 Scleria rutenbergiana  
 Scleria scabra  
 Scleria scabriuscula  – mosquito nutrush
 Scleria scandens  
 Scleria schenckiana  
 Scleria schiedeana  
 Scleria schimperiana  
 Scleria schulzii  
 Scleria scindens  – hairy nutrush
 Scleria scrobiculata  
 Scleria secans  – razor grass 
 Scleria sellowiana  
 Scleria setulosociliata  
 Scleria sheilae  
 Scleria sieberi  
 Scleria skutchii  
 Scleria sobolifer  
 Scleria sororia  
 Scleria sphacelata  
 Scleria sphaerocarpa  
 Scleria spicata  
 Scleria spiciformis  
 Scleria splitgerberiana  
 Scleria sprucei  
 Scleria staheliana  
 Scleria stenophylla  
 Scleria stereorrhiza  
 Scleria stipitata  
 Scleria stipularis  
 Scleria stocksiana  
 Scleria sumatrensis  – Sumatran scleria
 Scleria swamyi  
 Scleria sylvestris  
 Scleria tenacissima  
 Scleria tenella  – fly nutrush
 Scleria tepuiensis  
 Scleria terrestris  
 var. hookeriana  
 var. thomsoniana  
 Scleria tessellata  
 var. sphaerocarpa  
 Scleria testacea  – Hawai'i nutrush
 Scleria thwaitesiana  
 Scleria tonkinensis  
 Scleria transvaalensis  
 Scleria trialata  
 Scleria tricuspidata  
 Scleria triglomerata  – whip nutrush
 Scleria triquetra  
 Scleria tropicalis  
 Scleria tryonii  
 Scleria uleana  
 Scleria unguiculata  
 Scleria vaginata  
 Scleria valdemuricata  
 Scleria variegata  
 Scleria venezuelensis  
 Scleria verrucosa  
 Scleria verticillata  – low nutrush
 Scleria veseyfitzgeraldii  
 Scleria vichadensis  
 Scleria violacea  
 Scleria virgata  
 Scleria vogelii  
 Scleria warmingiana  
 Scleria welwitschii  
 Scleria williamsii  
 Scleria woodii  
 var. ornata  
 Scleria wrightiana  
 Scleria xerophila  
 Scleria zambesica

References

Scleria
 List